Dominik Ascherbauer (born 21 August 1989) is an Austrian handball player for HC Linz and the Austrian national team.

References

1989 births
Living people
Austrian male handball players
Sportspeople from Linz